Prince Krzysztof Radziwiłł, epithet "Piorun" ("Lightning") (1547–1603) was a Reichsfürst of the Holy Roman Empire and a member of the nobility of the Polish–Lithuanian Commonwealth.

He was cup-bearer of Lithuania from 1569; Field Hetman of Lithuania from 1572; Castellan of Trakai, Deputy Chancellor of Lithuania from 1579; Voivode of Vilnius Voivodeship from 1584; Lithuanian Grand Hetman from 1589; and Starost.

Life

Radziwiłł was one of the most talented commanders in the service of the Polish–Lithuanian Commonwealth during the wars against Muscovy and Sweden, and won the Battle of Kokenhausen. He received the epithet Piorun ("Lightning";  "Thunderbolt") for his deadly and very successful cavalry raids against Ivan the Terrible's forces in Russian Tsardom territory during the Livonian War, forcing it to capitulate. 

His achievements, combined with his powerful Radziwiłł family backing, helped him rise to his various voivode and starost offices and further increased his family's wealth.

Like his father, brother, and nephew, he was an ardent Calvinist and adherent of the Polish Reformed Church, and defended it against the rise of the Counter-Reformation.

References

Secular senators of the Polish–Lithuanian Commonwealth
1547 births
1603 deaths
Military personnel from Vilnius
Polish Calvinist and Reformed Christians
Polish Princes of the Holy Roman Empire
Krzysztof Mikolaj
Polish people of the Livonian campaign of Stephen Báthory
Field Hetmans of the Grand Duchy of Lithuania
Great Hetmans of the Grand Duchy of Lithuania
Deputy Chancellors of the Grand Duchy of Lithuania
Voivode of Vilnius